Alcohol dehydrogenase (azurin) (type II quinoprotein alcohol dehydrogenase, quinohaemoprotein ethanol dehydrogenase, QHEDH, ADHIIB) is an enzyme with systematic name alcohol:azurin oxidoreductase. This enzyme catalyses the following chemical reaction

 primary alcohol + azurin  aldehyde + reduced azurin

This enzyme is a periplasmic PQQ-containing quinohemoprotein.

References

External links 
 

EC 1.1.9